Cabana District is one of twenty-one districts of the province Lucanas in Peru.

Geography 
Some of the highest mountains of the district are listed below:

Ethnic groups 
The people in the district are mainly indigenous citizens of Quechua descent. Quechua is the language which the majority of the population (57.13%) learnt to speak in childhood, 42.61% of the residents started speaking using the Spanish language (2007 Peru Census).

See also 
 Parqaqucha
 Usqunta

References